The 1978 CONCACAF Champions' Cup was the 14th edition of the annual international club football competition held in the CONCACAF region (North America, Central America and the Caribbean), the CONCACAF Champions' Cup. It determined that year's club champion of association football in the CONCACAF region and was played from 1 May until 17 September 1978 and all the matches in the tournament were played under the home/away match system.

The teams were split into 3 zones (North American, Central American and Caribbean), each one qualifying the winner to the final tournament, where the winners of the North American and Central American zones played a semi-final to decide who was going to play against the Caribbean champion in the final.

As the final part of the tournament was cancelled due to administrative problems, three teams, Comunicaciones (Guatemala) Defence Force (Trinidad and Tobago) and Leones Negros de Guadalajara (Mexico) were crowned champions by CONCACAF.

North American Zone

First round

1 Maccabi Los Angeles withdrew.

Second round

Central American Zone

First round

Second round

Third round

Caribbean Zone

First round

Second round

Third round

CONCACAF final series
The final series was scratched and the three qualifying teams declared joint champions due to administrative problems and disagreements over the dates for the matches.

Champions

References

1
CONCACAF Champions' Cup